Kyffhäuser was a Verwaltungsgemeinschaft ("collective municipality") in the district Kyffhäuserkreis, in Thuringia, Germany. It was disbanded on 31 December 2012. The seat of the Verwaltungsgemeinschaft was in Bendeleben.

The Verwaltungsgemeinschaft Kyffhäuser consisted of the following municipalities:
Badra
Bendeleben
Göllingen 
Günserode 
Hachelbich 
Oberbösa 
Rottleben
Seega 
Steinthaleben

Former Verwaltungsgemeinschaften in Thuringia